4 Songs Live EP is an EP by American singer-songwriter Josh Ritter. It was released on February 22, 2005.

The EP features live recordings of three songs from Hello Starling and one song from Golden Age of Radio. It was recorded in October 2003 and June 2004 at Vicar Street and the Green Energy Festival in Dublin.

Critical reception

Ritter's recordings on 4 Songs Live was described as an intoxicating stage presence.

Track listing
All songs written by Josh Ritter.

"Kathleen" – 4:35
"Golden Age of Radio" – 4:37
"You Don't Make It Easy Babe" – 3:36
"Snow Is Gone (Hello Starling)" – 4:12

Production credits
 Produced by Jim Lockhart
 Mastered by Emily Lazar
 Mixed by Kevin Shirley
 Audio engineered by Mark McGrath

References

External links
Josh Ritter official website

2005 EPs
Josh Ritter albums
V2 Records EPs